The 2016 European Aquatics Championships took place from 9 to 22 May 2016 in London, United Kingdom, in the London Aquatics Centre. It was the thirty second edition of the event, and the second held in the same year as a Summer Olympics. Hosts Great Britain headed the medal table for the second successive event; although their swimming return was slightly down, partly down to a small number of star names resting prior to Rio, the gap was made up by an outstanding performance in the diving pool.

Schedule
Competition dates by discipline are:

 Swimming: 16–22 May
 Diving: 9–15 May
 Synchronised swimming: 9–13 May

Medal table

Records

Swimming

Medal table

Results

Men's events

Women's events

Mixed events

Diving

Medal table

Results

Men's events

Women's events

Mixed and team events

Synchronised swimming

Medal table

Results

See also
 2015 World Aquatics Championships
 2017 World Aquatics Championships

References

External links
 
 Results book − Diving
 Results book − Synchronised swimming

 
LEN European Aquatics Championships
European Aquatics Championships
European Aquatics Championships
International aquatics competitions hosted by the United Kingdom
International sports competitions in London
European Aquatic Championships
European Aquatic Championships